Chester H. Byerly (March 5, 1918 – September 20, 1984) was a former Republican member of the Pennsylvania House of Representatives.

He died of a heart attack in 1984.

References

Republican Party members of the Pennsylvania House of Representatives
1918 births
1984 deaths
20th-century American politicians